Eunice "Nesing" Guerrero-Cucueco (born Eunice Pablo Guerrero, September 16, 1949 - February 12, 1991) was the first woman to serve as the governor of Aurora Province, Central Luzon, Philippines. Guerrero-Cucueco died in office as governor in 1991 in a plane crash. She was succeeded by Edgardo L. Ong.

A non-governmental organization (NGO) is named after her, the Governor Eunice Guerrero-Cucueco Foundation, Inc.

References 

1949 births
1991 deaths
Governors of Aurora (province)
University of the Philippines alumni
Ateneo de Manila University alumni
20th-century Filipino medical doctors
People from Aurora (province)